Nandi Award for Best Character Actress winners since:1994

Winners

References

Character Actress
Awards for actresses